"Big Wheels" is a single by Canadian rap rock band, Down with Webster. It is the second single from their album, Time to Win, Vol. 2. The song was released to radio on September 9, 2011 and released to digital download on September 13, 2011. The song debuted on the Canadian Hot 100 at #94.

Background
A 2:22 minute demo of Big Wheels was released in April, 2009. A 3:14 minute version was rerecorded and released as the second single from Time to Win, Vol. 2. The newer version has a changed second verse and a bridge was added to the newer version. A live version of the song was also featured in the bands iTunes Session. The song won "Post Production of the Year" at the 2012 MuchMusic Video Awards.

Music video
A music video for the song was filmed on August 14, 2011. The music video was directed by Aaron A, making it the fourth collaboration between Down with Webster and Aaron A. The music video premiere for "Big Wheels" was shown on September 19, 2011 on the MuchMusic show New.Music.Live. The music video debuted on the MuchMusic Countdown at #28 on September 23, 2011 and has peaked at #6 on the week November 11, 2011.

The music video has a retro 8-bit video game theme. Video games featured throughout the video include Paperboy, Super Mario Kart, Duck Hunt, NBA Jam and Super Mario World.

Chart performance
The song debuted on the Canadian Hot 100 at No. 94 on the week of October 15, 2011. "Big Wheels" has peaked at #51 on the week of November 19, 2011. It has spent a total of thirteen weeks on the chart.

Charts

Track listing

References

2011 singles
Down with Webster songs
Music videos directed by Aaron A
2011 songs
Universal Music Canada singles